Land of the Rising Sound, Vol. 1 is a Japanese compilation album released in 2008 by N2O Entertainment.

Track listing

References

External links
Bombfactory.jp, the official website of Bomb Factory
Uzumaki's official website
No High Roller's Myspace page

2008 compilation albums
Compilation albums by Japanese artists